During 2004, tropical cyclones formed within seven different tropical cyclone basins, located within various parts of the Atlantic, Pacific and Indian Oceans. During the year, a total of 132 systems formed with 82 of these developing further and were named by the responsible warning centre. The most active basin in the year was the Western Pacific, which documented 29 named systems, while the North Atlantic, despite only amounting to 15 named systems, was the basin's most active season since 1996. Conversely, both the Eastern Pacific hurricane and North Indian Ocean cyclone seasons experienced the fewest cyclones reaching tropical storm intensity in recorded history, numbering 12 and 4, respectively. Activity across the southern hemisphere's three basins—South-West Indian, Australian, and South Pacific—was spread evenly, with each region recording seven named storms apiece. Throughout the year, 28 Category 3 tropical cyclones formed, including seven Category 5 tropical cyclones formed in the year.

The costliest tropical cyclone was Hurricane Ivan, which struck Caribbean and United States in September causing a tornado outbreak, with US$26.1 billion in damage. The deadliest tropical cyclone of the year was Hurricane Jeanne who killed for at least 3,006 deaths in Haiti.

Global atmospheric and hydrological conditions

Due to a Modoki El Niño – a rare type of El Niño in which unfavorable conditions are produced over the eastern Pacific instead of the Atlantic basin due to warmer sea surface temperatures farther west along the equatorial Pacific – activity was above average in North Atlantic Ocean.

Summary

North Atlantic Ocean 
It was an above average season in which 16 tropical cyclones formed. All but one tropical depression attained tropical storm status, and nine of these became hurricanes. Six hurricanes further intensified into major hurricanes.

Systems
A total of 138 systems formed globally in the year with 60 of them causing significant damage, deaths, and/or setting records for their basin.

January

7 storms formed on January, in the Australian and Southwestern Indian basin, respectively. Cyclone Frank was the strongest.

February

5 systems formed on February. 3 on Australian region, 1 on South Pacific basin, and 1 on the Western Pacific. Tropical Cyclone Ivy is the strongest.

March
Average storms forming 12 storms. Strongest storm is Cyclone Gafilo with 895 hpa,
Hurricane Catarina was the record breaking and the only hurricane in the South Atlantic.

April
Below average forming 9 systems. Only Typhoon Sudal (2004) became a storm, mostly being a depression.

May

8 systems formed on May. Typhoon Nida is the strongest.

June

7 storms formed on June. Typhoon Dianmu is the strongest.

July

August

September

October

November

December

Global effects

See also

 Tropical cyclones by year
 List of earthquakes in 2004
 Tornadoes of 2004
 2004 Indian Ocean earthquake and tsunami

Notes

1 Only systems that formed either on or after January 1, 2004 are counted in the seasonal totals.
2 Only systems that formed either before or on December 31, 2004 are counted in the seasonal totals.3 The wind speeds for this tropical cyclone/basin are based on the IMD scale which uses 3-minute sustained winds.
4 The wind speeds for this tropical cyclone/basin are based on the Saffir–Simpson scale which uses 1-minute sustained winds.5The wind speeds for this tropical cyclone are based on Météo-France which uses gust winds.

References

External links 

Regional Specialized Meteorological Centers
 US National Hurricane Center – North Atlantic, Eastern Pacific
 Central Pacific Hurricane Center – Central Pacific
 Japan Meteorological Agency – NW Pacific
 India Meteorological Department – Bay of Bengal and the Arabian Sea
 Météo-France – La Reunion – South Indian Ocean from 30°E to 90°E
 Fiji Meteorological Service – South Pacific west of 160°E, north of 25° S

Tropical Cyclone Warning Centers
 Meteorology, Climatology, and Geophysical Agency of Indonesia – South Indian Ocean from 90°E to 141°E, generally north of 10°S
 Australian Bureau of Meteorology (TCWC's Perth, Darwin & Brisbane) – South Indian Ocean & South Pacific Ocean from 90°E to 160°E, generally south of 10°S
 Papua New Guinea National Weather Service – South Pacific Ocean from 141°E to 160°E, generally north of 10°S
 Meteorological Service of New Zealand Limited – South Pacific west of 160°E, south of 25°S

Tropical cyclones by year
Tropícal cyclones in 2004
2004 Atlantic hurricane season
2004 Pacific hurricane season
2004 Pacific typhoon season
2004 North Indian Ocean cyclone season
2003–04 Australian region cyclone season
2004–05 Australian region cyclone season
2003–04 South Pacific cyclone season
2004–05 South Pacific cyclone season
2003–04 South-West Indian Ocean cyclone season
2004–05 South-West Indian Ocean cyclone season
2004-related lists